J & J or J and J may refer to:

 Johnson & Johnson, an American multinational medical devices, pharmaceutical and consumer packaged goods manufacturer
 J & J Snack Foods, an American food and beverage manufacturing and marketing conglomerate
 J & J Ultralights, an American ultralight aircraft manufacturer
 Jaffa–Jerusalem railway, a railroad that connected Jaffa and Jerusalem
 Jamie Noble and Joey Mercury, an American wrestling tag team known as J&J Security

See also 
 JJ (disambiguation)
 Jack and Jill (disambiguation)